Kiwittsmoor is a station on the Hamburg U-Bahn line U1. It was opened in May 1960 and is located in Hamburg, Germany, in the quarter of Langenhorn. Langenhorn is part of the borough of Hamburg-Nord.

History 
The station was built since 1959 and opened in May 1960. Originally it was not planned during the construction of the Langenhorn railway, as the settlement in the area did not begin before the 1950s. In 2013 the station was fully renovated, a lift was added, and a part of the platform was elevated for easier access of handicapped persons to the trains.

Station layout
Kiwittsmoor is an elevated station with an island platform and two tracks. The station is fully accessible for handicapped persons, as there is a lift. There is a Park and Ride facility with 303 parking slots, which is temporarily closed, because a container residence for 590 migrants was built on it.

Service
Kiwittsmoor is served by Hamburg U-Bahn line U1; departures are every 5 minutes, every 10 minutes in non-busy periods.

See also

 List of Hamburg U-Bahn stations

References

External links 

 Line and route network plans at hvv.de 

Hamburg U-Bahn stations in Hamburg
U1 (Hamburg U-Bahn) stations
Buildings and structures in Hamburg-Nord
Railway stations in Germany opened in 1960
1960 establishments in West Germany